Aleksiev Glacier is the 10.5 km long and 3 km wide glacier on Nordenskjöld Coast in Graham Land situated northeast of Kladorub Glacier and south of the glacier featuring Arrol Icefall.  It drains the southeast slopes of Detroit Plateau, and flows east-southeastwards to enter Desislava Cove in Weddell Sea.  The feature is named after the Bulgarian artist and writer Rayko Aleksiev (1893–1944).

Location
British mapping in 1978.

See also
 List of glaciers in the Antarctic
 Glaciology

Maps
 British Antarctic Territory.  Scale 1:200000 topographic map.  DOS 610 Series, Sheet W 64 60.  Directorate of Overseas Surveys, Tolworth, UK, 1978.
 Antarctic Digital Database (ADD). Scale 1:250000 topographic map of Antarctica. Scientific Committee on Antarctic Research (SCAR). Since 1993, regularly upgraded and updated.

References
 Aleksiev Glacier SCAR Composite Antarctic Gazetteer
 Bulgarian Antarctic Gazetteer Antarctic Place-names Commission (Bulgarian)
 Basic data (English)

External links
 Aleksiev Glacier. Copernix satellite image

Bulgaria and the Antarctic
Glaciers of Nordenskjöld Coast